Östersunds Fotbollsklubb, commonly known simply as Östersunds FK, Östersund or (especially locally) ÖFK, is a Swedish professional football club located in Östersund, Sweden, that plays in the Swedish second tier, Superettan. The club was formed in 1996 as a merger of several Östersund clubs. The club is affiliated with the Jämtland-Härjedalens Fotbollförbund and play their home games at Jämtkraft Arena. The club colours, reflected in their crest and kit, are red and black, predominantly in stripes and with red shorts and socks. 

From its creation, the club played mostly in the third tier of Swedish football but in 2013 Östersund achieved promotion to the second tier, Superettan, after achieving two consecutive promotions. In 2016 Östersund was promoted to the Swedish first tier, Allsvenskan, for the first time. In 2017, Östersund won the Svenska Cupen and qualified for the UEFA Europa League. The club was relegated to Superettan in 2021.

Name
The name 'Östersunds' is in a possessive clause in the Swedish language, which means it is incorrect to call the club anything other than Östersund in a short form based on the town name.

Background
Östersunds FK was created in 1996 when the three local clubs Ope IF, IFK Östersund and Östersund/Torvalla FF merged, aiming to create a club in that would be able to establish itself in the top two tiers of Swedish football. The next year Frösö IF also joined the project. The newly formed club started out their existence in the third tier in 1997 and Östersund/Torvalla FF ceased to exist as a consequence. IFK Östersund, Ope IF och Östersund/Torvalla FF (ÖTFF). In 2000 a fifth club, Fältjägarnas IF, was also merged into the club.

During the 2000s the club started taking on an English flavour and in 2007 the director of football Daniel Kindberg used his friendship with coaches Roberto Martínez and Graeme Jones to start a cooperation with Swansea City where Östersund would loan young players from the club. Swansea also came over to Östersund to play the inauguration game at the newly built stadium. After a poor 2010 season the club was relegated to the fourth tier for the first time ever.

In 2011 Daniel Kindberg returned to the role as director of football and increased financial backing from local companies which enabled the hiring of more full-time staff. Following Jones' recommendation the club also brought in young English manager Graham Potter who was working at an English university at the time. Through several successful signings, some coming from Potter's connections at Nike Football Academy, the club was able to win both the fourth tier and then the third tier immediately the year after. The club was promoted to Superettan for the 2013 season and finished 10th that season.

In January 2014 the club announced that they had signed a half-billion kronor deal with the government of Libya to develop and educate Libyan football players. Under the terms of the deal, Östersunds FK would train 250 young men from Libya every year, except the first year in which they will receive 60 students. Those players would be taught English and computer skills in addition to sports theory and football training. The deal was expected to raise Östersund FKs yearly profits by over 50%. The deal with the Libyan state never came to life, thus meaning no students came to Östersund and no money was received by the club.

On 27 October 2015, the club was promoted to Allsvenskan for the first time. In 2017, they managed to win their first major trophy, Svenska Cupen, after defeating IFK Norrköping 4–1 in the final, also qualifying for the 2017–18 UEFA Europa League, marking their first appearance in a European competition tournament. In their Europa League debut in the second qualifying round on 13 July 2017, Östersund earned a shock 2–0 victory against Turkish giants Galatasaray at the Jämtkraft Arena and eliminated them after a 1–1 draw in Istanbul. Two goals by Saman Ghoddos in a win against PAOK on 24 August saw them qualify for the Group Stage at the first time of asking, at the same time making them the only Swedish representative in the season's UEFA competition and making Graham Potter the only British manager in the Europa League Group Stage. After losing only one game in their campaign, they finished second in a group featuring Athletic Bilbao and Hertha Berlin, becoming the first Swedish club to progress beyond the Europa League group stage. In the round of 32 they managed to beat English side Arsenal 2–1 away but were eliminated 4–2 on aggregate after losing the first leg 3–0.

On 17 April 2018, club chairman (also the director of football) Daniel Kindberg was taken into custody by the Swedish Economic Crime Authority, suspected on probable cause of serious fraud and for assisting in serious gross accounting violations. Together with two other people, Kindberg is suspected of submitting false invoices in several companies, according to the prosecutor. Several of these companies have strong ties to Östersunds FK and the club's sponsorship deals. Several years before, in 2014, Kindberg was subject to criticism when Östersundshem, the municipal housing company where he was the CEO, became a big sponsor of Östersunds FK.

On 11 June 2018, Graham Potter left Östersunds FK to take over as manager of Swansea City after eight seasons in charge. 

On 31 October 2021, they were relegated from Allsvenskan after they lost against Varberg BoIS. In the 2022 season, Östersunds FK will play in Superettan, the second tier of Swedish men's professional football. Östersund played six seasons in Allsvenskan before they were relegated.

Season to season

European record

Overall record
Accurate as of 23 February 2018

Matches

Notes
 2Q: Second qualifying round
 3Q: Third qualifying round
 PO: Play-off round
 GS: Group Stage
 R32: Round of 32

UEFA Team rank
The following list ranks the current position of Östersunds FK in UEFA ranking:

As of 21 September 2020.

Players

First-team squad

Notable players
This list of notable players includes those who have either been named player of the year at the club, or has become league top goalscorer, or went on to play in Allsvenskan (or for larger clubs abroad).

 Alan Al-Kadhi
 Alex Dyer
 Alhaji Gero
 Bobo Sollander
 Brian Wake
 Brwa Nouri
 Connor Ripley
 Christoffer Fryklund
 Daryl Smylie
 David Accam
 Dennis Widgren
 Douglas Bergqvist
 Erik Lantto
 Filip Rogić
 Fouad Bachirou
 Fredrik Aliris
 Gabriel Somi
 Hosam Aiesh
 Jamal Blackman
 Jamie Hopcutt
 Joakim Lundstedt
 Jonathan Routledge
 Ken Sema
 Kjell Jönsson
 Lars Oscarsson
 Lasse Mattila
 Lee Makel
 Mattias Eriksson
 Matthew Barnes-Homer
 Martin Johansson
 Mikael Berg
 Modou Barrow
 Michael Tidser
 Moon Seon-min
 Paul Sheerin
 Peter Amoran
 Petter Augustsson
 Rasmus Lindkvist
 Ravel Morrison
 Richard Offiong
 Saman Ghoddos
 Samuel Mensiro
 Sotirios Papagiannopoulos
 Thomas Isherwood
 Tom Pettersson

Player records

Top 10 players with most games in ÖFK

Player of the season in ÖFK

Top 10 players with most goals in ÖFK

Management and boardroom

Technical staff
As of 24 January 2021

Boardroom
Östersunds FK (Föreningen)

Östersunds FK Elitfotboll AB

Coaches

  Leif Widegren (1997)
  Christer Andersson (1998)
  Sören Åkeby (1999)
  Jan Westerlund (1999–2001)
  Hans Eskilsson (2002–2003)
  Ulf Kvarnlöf (2004–2005)
  Stefan Regebro (2006–2007)
  Neil McDonald (2007)
  Kalle Björklund (2008–2009)
  Lee Makel (2010)
   Graham Potter (2011–2018)
  Ian Burchnall (2018–2020)
   Amir Azrafshan (2020–2021)
   Per Joar Hansen (2021–2022)
   Magnus Powell (2022-)

Attendances

In recent seasons Östersunds FK have had the following average attendances:

Honours

League
 Superettan (Tier 2)
 Runners-up (1): 2015
 Division 1 Norra (Tier 3)
 Winners (1): 2012
 Division 2 Norrland (Tier 3)*
 Winners (1): 1999
 Runners-up (3): 1998, 2003, 2005
 Division 2 Norrland (Tier 4)*
 Winners (1): 2011

Cups
 Svenska Cupen
 Winners (1): 2016–17
* League restructuring in 2006 resulted in a new division being created at Tier 3 and subsequent divisions dropping a level.

References

External links

 Östersunds FK – official site

 
Football clubs in Jämtland County
Sport in Östersund
Association football clubs established in 1996
1996 establishments in Sweden
Svenska Cupen winners